Irina Tyukhay (born 14 January 1967) is a retired Russian heptathlete.

She won the bronze medals at the 1995 World Indoor Championships and the 1995 Summer Universiade, finished fifteenth at the 1995 World Championships and nineteenth at the 1996 Olympic Games.

Her personal best score was 6604 points, achieved in July 1995 in Götzis.

References 

1967 births
Living people
Olympic heptathletes
Russian heptathletes
Olympic athletes of Russia
Athletes (track and field) at the 1996 Summer Olympics
Universiade medalists in athletics (track and field)
Universiade bronze medalists for Russia
Medalists at the 1995 Summer Universiade
World Athletics Championships athletes for Russia
Russian Athletics Championships winners